Berwick-upon-Tweed is a railway station on the East Coast Main Line, which runs between  and . It is owned by Network Rail and managed by London North Eastern Railway.

It is the most northerly railway station in England, being less than three miles from the border with Scotland. The station, with its long single island platform, lies immediately to the north of the Royal Border Bridge.

History 

In 1847, the Great Hall of Berwick Castle had to be demolished to make way for the new station (the former West Wall of the castle still marks the boundary of the now-defunct station goods yard), which opened the following year. This replaced an initial structure erected by the North British Railway, whose line from the north first reached the town in 1846.  The Newcastle and Berwick Railway meanwhile reached the southern bank of the River Tweed in March 1847, but it was another eighteen months before a temporary viaduct across the river was commissioned to allow through running between Edinburgh and Newcastle.  This in turn was replaced by the current Royal Border Bridge in July 1850.  The station was rebuilt by the London and North Eastern Railway in 1927 and the buildings are Grade-II listed.

The station was also at one time served by local stopping trains between Newcastle and Edinburgh and the branch line from Newtown St Boswells via Kelso (which joined the main line at Tweedmouth, on the other side of the river) from 1851 until closure in 1964.

For approximately 5 months in 1979, this was the terminus for services from London King's Cross after the East Coast Main Line was blocked by the collapse of Penmanshiel Tunnel. Buses linked this station with Dunbar, from where a railway shuttle service continued to Edinburgh Waverley.

Facilities
The station has a council-run car park nearby, and is staffed throughout the week during working hours.  Several self-service ticket machines are available for use outside these times and for collecting pre-paid tickets.  Other facilities on offer on the concourse include a waiting room, Costa coffee shop, vending machine, payphone and toilets, whilst there is a First Class lounge on the platform.  The two are linked by a fully accessible footbridge with lifts.  Train running information is offered via digital CIS displays, audible announcements and timetable posters.

Services 
London North Eastern Railway operate an hourly service that stops here. CrossCountry operates a two-hourly service in each direction during the day with most running on to Glasgow.

From December 2019, one TransPennine Express service in each direction began to call at Berwick-upon-Tweed. In September 2021, the operator announced that they would be introducing a five return trains per weekday semi-fast service between Newcastle and Edinburgh from December 2021, which will call at Berwick.

References

Bibliography

External links

Railway stations in Northumberland
DfT Category C1 stations
Former North British Railway stations
Former North Eastern Railway (UK) stations
Railway stations in Great Britain opened in 1846
Railway stations served by CrossCountry
Railway stations served by London North Eastern Railway
Railway stations served by TransPennine Express
Berwick-upon-Tweed
1846 establishments in England